is a Japanese actor. He graduated from Juntendo University Sports Health Science Department. He is represented with Anoré. His father is Tomokazu Miura who is also an actor, his mother is actress and former singer Momoe Yamaguchi, and his brother is singer-songwriter and actor Yutaro Miura.

Filmography

Film

TV dramas

Advertisements

Awards

References

External links
  - 
 

Japanese male actors
People from Tokyo
1985 births
Living people